Greyfield land is underused real estate assets or land. The term was first coined in the UK in urban design theory in the late 1990s, and later adopted in the US about a decade later, with the name coming from the "sea" of empty asphalt concrete that often accompanies these sites. The word greyfield is a relative neologism as compared to more commonly known terms such as brownfield and greenfield.

In the UK, the term applies specifically to buildings and land in towns and cities that is underused and could be intensified by the addition of rooftop developments (in the case of an existing building) or 'airspace' developments (above an existing carpark, for example).

In the US, the term has historically been applied to formerly-viable retail and commercial shopping sites (such as regional malls and strip centers) that have suffered from lack of reinvestment and have been "outclassed" by larger, better-designed, better-anchored malls or shopping sites. These particular greyfield sites are also referred to as "dead malls" or "ghostboxes" if the anchor or other major tenants have vacated the premises leaving behind empty shells. Still in the US, the "greyfield" term may also be applied more broadly to urban infill or commercial locations where underused or outdated (non-retail) uses hamper an otherwise valuable real estate asset. An example would be a formerly industrial waterfront site that is potentially valuable as a mixed use/residential site as it is being encroached upon by residential sprawl, or other economic or redevelopment pressures. In this example, the revitalization of the greyfield may require zoning changes and/or a public-private partnership of some kind to achieve the highest and best use.

Background (US)
In 2001 the Congress for the New Urbanism re-coined the term "Greyfield," which refers to ageing strips of development that once served as vital commercial corridors during the post-World War II suburban exodus but have today fallen on harder times. In contrast to contaminated brownfields and undeveloped greenfields, greyfields refer to "so-called 'dead malls,' often characterized by the vast empty asphalt parking lots that surround them."

The most conservative calculations in 1999 estimated that there would be no fewer than 203 American defunct malls with a combined outstanding debt of over $2 billion and projected redevelopment costs of over $11 billion by 2004. In 2001, of the 2,000 American regional malls, it was estimated that nearly 20% were defunct malls or in danger of becoming so.

Examples of greyfield malls in American cities are the Central City Mall in San Bernardino, California; the Prestonwood Town Center in Dallas, Texas; the Maple Hill Pavilion in Kalamazoo, Michigan; and the Lafayette Plaza in Bridgeport, Connecticut.

Characteristics (US)

Located in established neighborhoods and shopping districts and on suburban arterials with bus service, many are already bus hubs.

They have formidable competition; on average, greyfield malls have 2.3 million square feet million square feet of competing retail space in 22 other centers within . They are often older and smaller than the most successful malls in their region.

Conventional renovations will not be sufficient to breathe new life into many properties. A facelift will do little to help. A new anchor store, depending on the center's position in the market, may not do much either.

Factors for US mall redevelopment
Critical factors necessary for the redevelopment of a greyfield site include the following:
Market conditions
Ownership and anchor tenant status
Site and location factors
Municipal and community capacity
Developer and lender capacity

Lessons from successful US greyfield transformations are based on the case studies conducted by the Congress for New Urbanism. These sites were the Paseo Colorado development in Pasadena, California; the City Place development in Long Beach, California; the Belmar development in Lakewood, Colorado; the Downtown Park Forest development in Park Forest, Illinois; the Mizner Park development in Boca Raton, Florida; and the Winter Park Village development in Winter Park, Florida. The lessons learned in this study were:
Incorporate features that will maximize environmental benefits.
Explore major physical changes.
Use car parking carefully.
Incorporate public amenities that add value and distinguish the development.
Include civic and institutional activities.
Expect a lengthy pre-development period and prepare for complications.
Establish a high standard for urban design.
Market the new concept.
Develop mixed-uses that can thrive independently.
Patient money is the best fit for town center projects.

References

Urban studies and planning terminology
Urban decay